The brown-flanked tanager (Thlypopsis pectoralis) is a species of bird in the family Thraupidae.
It is endemic to Peru.

Its natural habitats are subtropical or tropical high-altitude shrubland and heavily degraded former forest.

References

brown-flanked tanager
Birds of the Peruvian Andes
Endemic birds of Peru
brown-flanked tanager
brown-flanked tanager
Taxonomy articles created by Polbot